
Gmina Borów is a rural gmina (administrative district) in Strzelin County, Lower Silesian Voivodeship, in south-western Poland. It is part of the Wrocław metropolitan area.

Neighbouring gminas
Gmina Borów is bordered by the gminas of Domaniów, Jordanów Śląski, Kobierzyce, Kondratowice, Strzelin and Żórawina.

Villages
The gmina contains the villages of Bartoszowa, Boguszyce, Boreczek, Borek Strzeliński, Borów, Brzezica, Brzoza, Głownin, Jaksin, Jelenin, Kazimierzów, Kępino, Kojęcin, Kręczków, Kurczów, Ludów Śląski, Mańczyce, Michałowice, Opatowice, Piotrków Borowski, Rochowice, Siemianów, Stogi, Suchowice, Świnobród, Uniszów and Zielenice.

Twin towns – sister cities

Gmina Borów is twinned with:
 Medlov, Czech Republic

References

Borow
Strzelin County